Ilia Xhokaxhi (August 28, 1948 in Tirana – 2007) was an Albanian painter, scenographer, and costume designer.  He has served as the art director on a number of films.  As a painter, he has exhibited in numerous galleries both in Albania and abroad.

Selected filmography
 1980: Pas vdekjes
 1983: Nje emer midis njerezve
 1984: Lundrimi i pare
 1985: I paftuarit
 1986: Rrethimi i vogel
 1987: Eja!
 1987: Vrasje ne gjueti
 1988: Bregu i ashper
 1992: Vdekja e burrit
 1994: Nekrologji
 1998: Dasma e Sakos
 1998: Nata
 1999: Funeral Business
 2003: Lule të kuqe, lule të zeza

References

1948 births
2007 deaths
20th-century Albanian painters
People from Tirana